County routes in Nassau County, New York, are maintained by the Nassau County Department of Public Works and have been unsigned since the 1970s. The designations are largely in alphabetical order. Routes C01 to C25 are listed below; unused route designations are skipped.

County Route C01 

County Route C01 is a short county route known as Arrandale Avenue, which extends for  through Kings Point and Great Neck. It begins at Bayview Avenue (CR C09) in Kings Point and the intersection of Middle Neck Road (CR 11) in Great Neck.

 Major intersections

County Route C02 

County Route C02 is known as Atlantic Avenue and extends for  through East Rockaway and Lynbrook.

CR C02 was formerly part of CR 3, prior to the route numbers for county routes in Nassau County being altered.

Major intersections along the route include Scranton Avenue, Union Avenue, Sunrise Highway (NY 27), and Merrick Road (CR 27).

CR C02 was formerly designated as part of CR 10, prior to the route numbers in Nassau County being altered.

County Route C03 

County Route C03 is known as Atlantic Avenue and extends for  through Oceanside, Baldwin, and Freeport.

The western terminus of CR C03 is Waukena Avenue in Oceanside, while the eastern terminus is South Main Street in Freeport.

CR C03 was formerly part of CR 90, prior to the route numbers for county roads in Nassau County being altered.

County Route C04 

County Route C04 is known as Atlantic Avenue and extends for  through East Rockaway and Oceanside.

The western terminus of CR C04 is Main Street in East Rockaway, while the eastern terminus is Long Beach Road in Oceanside. It intersects Ocean Avenue before crossing the Long Island Rail Road's Long Beach Branch. It then intersects Rockaway Avenue/Lawson Boulevard slightly to the east. It then continues east, ultimately terminating at Long Beach Road.

County Route C05 

County Route C05 is known as Austin Boulevard and connects Long Beach and Oceanside, serving as a bypass of Long Beach Road through Island Park. Its southern terminus is at the Long Beach Bridge, and its northern terminus is where it re-joins Long Beach Road.

It parallels the Long Island Rail Road's Long Beach Branch for much of its length.

CR C05 was formerly designated as part of CR 1, prior to the route numbers in Nassau County being altered.

County Route C06 

County Route C06 is a short county road which consists of the portions of Bates Road and Horace Harding Boulevard within Nassau County.

The route begins as Bates Road at the Queens–Nassau County border, in University Gardens, shortly thereafter entering the Incorporated Village of Lake Success. It then continues east, soon merging into Horace Harding Boulevard, continuing east. It then meets the North Service Road of the Long Island Expressway (I-495), ending at Lakeville Road (CR 11).

The road serves as a link between Little Neck Parkway (in Queens) and the Long Island Expressway.

Bates Road was formerly considered part of Lakeville Road.

CR C06 was formerly designated as part of CR 118, prior to the route numbers in Nassau County being altered.

County Route C09 

CR C09, south of Arrandale Avenue, crosses the 9-11 Memorial Bridge, entering Saddle Rock. It continues south, intersecting Old Mill Road (CR D78) and Emerson Drive, adjacent to Saddle Rock Elementary School. It then continues south, entering Great Neck Estates and intersecting Cedar Drive (CR C32), thence continuing south to its terminus at Cutter Mill Road.

The 9-11 Memorial Bridge was formerly known as the Saddle Rock Bridge (and before that as Udall's Bridge). It was renamed the 9-11 Memorial Bridge in December 2001, due to how the bridge was a gathering site after the September 11, 2001 attacks, and because of the clear view of the Twin Towers from the bridge.

CR C09 was formerly designated as part of CR 43, prior to the route numbers in Nassau County being altered.

County Route C10 

County Route C10 is a 1.87-mile (3.81 km) county road located entirely within Bayville, consisting of the portion of Bayville Avenue west of Ludlam Avenue (CR D41).

CR C10 begins at the Bayville–Locust Valley border. It then continues east to Ludlam Avenue, east of which the route becomes CR C12.

County Route C11 

County Route C11 is a 2.15-mile (3.46 km) county road in Locust Valley and Lattingtown, consisting of Bayville Road. It is a western continuation of CR C10.

CR C11 begins at Buckram Road in Locust Valley. From there, it continues north, soon entering the Incorporated Village of Lattingtown, and shortly thereafter intersection with Feeks Lane (CR C75). It then continues north to Horse Hollow Road (CR D20), hugging the west side of the Bailey Arboretum along the way. At Horse Hollow Road, Bayville Road turns east, thence to the northeast before turning north again. It then makes a final turn to the east, re-entering Locust Valley and then reaching the Locust Valley–Bayville border shortly thereafter, at which point the road becomes CR C10.

County Route C12 

County Route C12 is a 1.26-mile (2.03 km) county road located entirely within Bayville, consisting of the portion of Bayville Avenue east of Ludlam Avenue (CR D41), along with Centre Island Road up to the Centre Island border.

CR C12 begins at the Ludlam Avenue. It then continues east to intersecting West Harbor Drive. It then continues east, exiting the Incorporated Village of Bayville and entering an unincorporated section of the Town of Oyster Bay, soon becoming Centre Island Road. It continues east from there up to the Centre Island village line.

County Route C16 

County Route C16 is a 2.04-mile (3.68 km) county route, consisting of Berry Hill Road, between the Incorporated Village of Oyster Bay Cove and Oyster Bay.

CR C16 begins at North Hempstead Turnpike (NY 25A) in Oyster Bay Cove. It travels north, intersecting Amber Lane, thence continuing north to Sandy Hill Road. It then turns northwest, eventually intersecting McCouns Lane. It then continues northwest to Pine Hollow Road (NY 106) in Oyster Bay.

The route serves as a link between NY 25A and NY 106 – and between Oyster Bay and Syosset to its south.

County Route C17 
County Route C17 is a designation applied to two separate roads: Bethpage Road in Farmingdale and Birch Hill Road between Matinecock and Locust Valley.

Bethpage Road 
Bethpage road (CR C17) is a short, 0.35-mile (0.56 km) road located entirely within the Incorporated Village of Farmingdale. 

CR C17 begins at Round Swamp Road (CR 110) and continues east and south to Main Street (CR D42).

Bethpage Road and Main Street were both formerly part of CR 110, prior to the route numbers in Nassau County being altered.

Birch Hill Road 

Birch Hill Road (CR C17) is a short, 0.18-mile (0.29 km) road between Matinecock and Locust Valley.

CR C17 begins at Piping Rock Road (CR D89) in Matinecock. It briefly heads towards the northwest before turning more towards the north, soon entering Locust Valley and crossing the Long Island Rail Road's Oyster Bay Branch. It then terminates just north of this location, at its intersection with Forest Avenue (CR C79) and Buckram Road (CR C26).

Birch Hill Road then continues north as a town-maintained road without any county route designation.

County Route C18 

County Route C18 is a 0.92-mile (1.48 km) road in Woodmere and North Woodmere. The road is known as Branch Boulevard.

CR C18 begins at Peninsula Boulevard (CR 2) in Woodmere. It then heads north-northwest, hugging North Woodmere County Park and intersecting University Street. It then continues northwest, hugging the park, before veering towards the east, ending at Hungry Harbor Road.

The route largely follows or parallels the approximate route of the former Cedarhurst Cut-Off.

CR C18 was formerly designated as CR 135, prior to the route numbers in Nassau County being altered.

County Route C19 

County Route C19 is a short, 0.34-mile (0.55 km) county route entirely within the City of Glen Cove, known as Brewster Street.

CR C19 begins at Mill Hill Road. It then continues north-northeast to Cottage Row – at which point the CR C19 designation ceases and the name of the road changes.

County Route C21 

County Route C21 is a 0.37-mile (0.6 km) road entirely within the Incorporated Village of Freeport known as Broadway.

The route begins at North Main Street. From there, it continues northeast, intersecting Harding Place before ultimately terminating at North Columbus Avenue.

County Route C22 
County Route C22 is a designation applied to two separate roads: Broadway between Lawrence and Lynbrook, and Broadway in Bethpage.

Broadway (Lawrence–Lynbrook) 

Broadway (CR C22) is a 5.2-mile (8.37 km) thoroughfare between Lawrence and Lynbrook.

CR C22 begins at the Queens-Nassau County border in Lawrence. Continuing towards the east, it soon intersects Doughty Boulevard (CR 75), and then the Nassau Expressway (NY 878) immediately afterwards. It then continues towards the east, eventually intersecting Lawrence Avenue, thence turning towards the northeast until intersecting Rockaway Turnpike (CR 257) and Meadow Lane (CR D51). It then continues on a more easterly path, eventually turning again towards the northeast briefly before turning back towards the east as it enters Woodsburgh. Soon thereafter, Broadway intersects Woodmere Boulevard (CR E68), and then enters Woodmere. It then turns northeast again and soon intersects West Broadway (CR E51). It then continues northeast, soon entering Hewlett and intersecting East Rockaway Road (CR C64). It soon thereafter intersects Rockaway Avenue (CR E06), thence entering Lynbrook. Soon thereafter, it intersects Scranton Avenue (CR E18) before reaching Sunrise Highway (NY 27). It then crosses underneath the Long Island Rail Road, and soon thereafter terminates at Merrick Road (CR 27).

CR C22 was formerly designated as CR 54, prior to the route numbers in Nassau County being altered.

Broadway (Bethpage) 

Broadway (CR C22) is a short, 0.18-mile (0.29 km) county road in Bethpage.

CR C22 begins at Central Avenue (CR C35), extending 0.18 miles (0.29 km) towards the north.

County Route C23 
County Route C23 is a designation applied to two separate roads: Brooklyn Avenue in Freeport and Brookside Avenue North in Roosevelt.

Brooklyn Avenue 

Brooklyn Avenue (CR C23) is a short, 0.11-mile (0.18 km) county road entirely within the Incorporated Village of Freeport.

CR C23 begins at North Grove Street. It then continues east to North Main Street, at which point Brooklyn Avenue becomes Broadway (CR C21).

Brookside Avenue North 

Brookside Avenue North (CR C23) is a 1.1-mile (1.77 km) road in Roosevelt.

CR C23 begins at the Freeport–Roosevelt border. It continues north through the hamlet, intersecting Centennial Avenue. From there, it continues towards the north, terminating at Nassau Road (CR 7B).

North of this intersection Brookside Avenue North becomes Uniondale Avenue (CR 188).

County Route C24 
County Route C24 is a designation applied to two separate roads: Brookside Avenue South in Freeport and Brower Avenue in Oceanside.

Brookside Avenue South 

Brookside Avenue South (CR C24) is a short, 0.31-mile (0.5 km) county road entirely within the Incorporated Village of Freeport.

CR C24 begins at Merrick Road (CR 27). It then continues north to its terminus at Sunrise Highway (NY 27).

Brower Avenue 

Brower Avenue (CR C24) is a 0.83-mile (1.34 km) road in Oceanside.

CR C24 begins at Oceanside Road (CR D75). It then continues southeast and east, eventually reaching Waukena Avenue. From there, the road continues as Atlantic Avenue (CR C03), which continues east to Freeport.

County Route C25 

County Route C25 is a short, 0.37-mile (0.6 km) road in the Incorporated Village of Hewlett Neck and the Incorporated Village of Woodsburgh, known as Browers Point Branch Road.

CR C25 begins at Woodmere Boulevard (CR E68) in Woodsburgh. It soon intersects Barberry Lane and then continues to wind its way through a neighborhood, ending at another, nearby intersection with Woodmere Boulevard in Hewlett Neck.

CR C25 was formerly designated as part of CR 93A, prior to the route numbers in Nassau County being altered.
Major intersections

References 

County routes in Nassau County, New York